Carrefour du Nord is a regional shopping mall in Saint-Jérôme, Quebec, Canada. It opened on August 11, 1976 with Steinberg's, Dominion, Kmart and 76 stores. Sears inaugurated the following year. It was enlarged in 1987, 1994 and 2003. It has always been a Westcliff property. 

Anchor tenants
Cinémas Saint-Jérôme
Maxi & Cie
Sports Experts/Atmosphere

References

External links
Official website

Buildings and structures in Saint-Jérôme
Shopping malls established in 1976
Shopping malls in Quebec
Tourist attractions in Laurentides
1976 establishments in Quebec